A syndrome is a set of medical signs and symptoms that are correlated with each other. A syndrome can affect one or more of body systems. Different syndromes affect different groups of organs. This is a list of syndromes that may affect the heart. Syndromes affecting primarily the heart are written in bold letters.

References

External links
 What Is the Heart? – NIH